7 Days in Havana is a 2012 Spanish-language anthology film. Set during a week in the Cuban capital Havana, the film features one segment for each day, each segment directed by a different filmmaker. The directors are Julio Medem, Laurent Cantet, Juan Carlos Tabío, Benicio del Toro, Gaspar Noé, Pablo Trapero and Elia Suleiman. The screenplay was written by the Cuban novelist Leonardo Padura Fuentes. The film is a co-production between companies in Spain, France and Cuba. It was shot on location in Havana.

Segments
 "El Yuma" (Monday, Benicio del Toro)
 "Jam Session" (Tuesday, Pablo Trapero)
 "La tentación de Cecilia" (Wednesday, Julio Medem)
 "Diary of a Beginner" (Thursday, Elia Suleiman)
 "Ritual" (Friday, Gaspar Noé)
 "Dulce amargo" (Saturday, Juan Carlos Tabío)
 "La fuente" (Sunday, Laurent Cantet)

Cast
 Daniel Brühl as Spanish Businessman
 Emir Kusturica as himself
 Elia Suleiman as himself
 Josh Hutcherson as Teddy Atkins
 Vladimir Cruz
 Mirta Ibarra
 Jorge Perugorria
 Alexander Abreu (a sensational musician and international star, founder of Havana d'Primera) as Albert

Production
The film is a co-production between Spain's Morena Films and France's Full House, in association with Cuba's Havana Club International. It had a budget of around €3 million. Filming took place in Havana from 4 March to 6 May 2011.

Release
The film competed in the Un Certain Regard section at the 2012 Cannes Film Festival.

Reception
On Rotten Tomatoes the film had an approval rating of 40% based on reviews from 15 critics.

References

External links
 
 
 

2012 films
2012 drama films
Spanish drama films
French drama films
2010s Spanish-language films
Films directed by Benicio del Toro
Films directed by Pablo Trapero
Films directed by Julio Medem
Films directed by Elia Suleiman
Films directed by Gaspar Noé
Films directed by Juan Carlos Tabío
Films directed by Laurent Cantet
Spanish anthology films
Films set in Havana
Films shot in Havana
French anthology films
2010s French films
2010s Spanish films
Cultural depictions of Emir Kusturica